Sigma Arae (σ Ara, σ Arae) is the Bayer designation for a star in the southern constellation of Ara. It is visible to the naked eye with an apparent visual magnitude of +4.575.

This is an A-type main sequence star with a stellar classification of A0 V. Unusually for an A-type star, X-ray emissions with a luminosity of  have been detected from Sigma Arae. Normally this is explained by the presence of a lower mass orbiting companion star. However, such a scenario does not appear to hold true for this star.

References

External links
 Simbad
 Image Sigma Arae

159217
Arae, Sigma
Ara (constellation)
A-type main-sequence stars
086092
6537
Durchmusterung objects